Love (Korean: 러브; Leobeu) is the third Korean studio album by S.E.S., released in October 29, 1999, by S.M. Entertainment. It sold 760,475 copies and became the second best-selling Korean girl group album at the time, only behind The Pearl Sisters' My Dear (1968). The record spawned two singles "Love" and "Twilight Zone".

Track listing

2000 S.E.S. First Concert 
S.E.S. held their first live solo concert titled "A Sweet Kiss From The World of Dream" in support of the album. It took place on March 19, 2000, at the Olympic Gymnastics Arena in Seoul and included performances of both their Japanese and Korean songs. A live video CD of the concert was released by SM Entertainment in June 2000.

Charts and sales

Monthly charts

Yearly charts

Sales

Accolades

References

External links 
  S.E.S.' Official Site
  SM Entertainment's Official Site

1999 albums
S.E.S. (group) albums
SM Entertainment albums